List of champions of the 1906 U.S. National Championships tennis tournament (now known as the US Open). The men's tournament was held from 21 August to 29 August on the outdoor grass courts at the Newport Casino in Newport, Rhode Island. The women's tournament was held from 19 June to 23 June on the outdoor grass courts at the Philadelphia Cricket Club in Philadelphia, Pennsylvania. It was the 26th U.S. National Championships and the second Grand Slam tournament of the three played that year.

Finals

Men's singles

 William Clothier defeated  Beals Wright  6–3, 6–0, 6–4

Women's singles

 Helen Homans defeated  Maud Barger-Wallach  6–4, 6–3

Men's doubles
 Holcombe Ward (USA) /  Beals Wright (USA) defeated  Fred Alexander (USA) /  Harold Hackett (USA) 6–3, 3–6, 6–3, 6–3

Women's doubles
 Ann Burdette Coe (USA) /  Ethel Bliss Platt (USA) defeated  Helen Homans (USA) /  Clover Boldt (USA) 6–4, 6–4

Mixed doubles
 Sarah Coffin (USA) /  Edward Dewhurst (AUS) defeated  Margaret Johnson (USA) /  J.B. Johnson (USA) 6–3, 7–5

References

External links
Official US Open website

 
U.S. National Championships
U.S. National Championships (tennis) by year
U.S. National Championships
U.S. National Championships (tennis)
U.S. National Championships (tennis)
U.S. National Championships (tennis)
U.S. National Championships (tennis)